Titulcia eximia is a moth of the family Nolidae first described by Francis Walker in 1864. It is found in Borneo, Myanmar (Mergui Archipelago), Peninsular Malaysia and Sumatra.

References

Chloephorinae
Moths of Borneo